Sérvulo Barbosa Bessa or simply Sérvulo  (born December 21, 1985 in Niterói), is a Brazilian goalkeeper. He currently plays for Campinense.

Contract
2 January 2008 to 31 December 2008

External links
 atletico.com.br
 sambafoot
 zerozero.pt
 CBF
 Profile & Statistics at Guardian's Stats Centre

1985 births
Living people
Brazilian footballers
América Futebol Clube (RN) players
Clube Atlético Mineiro players
Association football goalkeepers
Sportspeople from Niterói